Théodore Anne (7 April 1797 – 12 August 1869) was a French playwright, librettist, and novelist.

Engaged in the army in 1814, until the July Revolution of 1830 he was a member of the compagnie de Noailles then, still faithful to the Bourbons, he resigned.

An editor at the journal La France, a drama critic for the L'Union journal and a collaborator with Revue et gazette des théâtres, he authored numerous plays which were presented on the most significant Parisian stages of the 19th century: Théâtre du Vaudeville, Théâtre de la Gaité, Théâtre de l'Ambigu-Comique, Académie royale de musique, Théâtre des Nouveautés etc.

Works 

1818: Le Fureteur, ou l'Anti-Minerve
1820: Éloge historique du duc de Berri
1822: Le Coq de village, tableau-vaudeville in 1 act, by Charles-Simon Favart, given to the theatre with modifications, with  Eugène Hyacinthe Laffillard
1824: Alfred, ou la Bonne Tête ! !, vaudeville in 1 act, with Achille d'Artois
1824: Les Deux officiers, vaudeville in 1 act, with Achille d'Artois
1824: La Rue du Carrousel, ou le Musée en boutique, vaudeville in 1 act, with Espérance Hippolyte Lassagne
1825: La Saint-Henri, divertissement, with Achille d'Artois, music by Felice Blangini
1825: Les Châtelaines, ou les Nouvelles Amazones, vaudeville in 1 act, with Achille d'Arbois
1825: L'Exilé, vaudeville in 2 acts, from Old Mortality, by Walter Scott, with Achille d'Artois and Henri de Tully
1825: L'Intendant et le garde-chasse, vaudeville, with Marc-Antoine Désaugiers, music by Felice Blangini
1825: Madrid, ou Observations sur les mœurs et usages des Espagnols, au commencement du XIXe siècle, with Mathurin-Joseph Brisset
1826: Le Dilettante, ou le Siège de l'Opéra, folie-vaudeville in 5 small acts, with Jean-Baptiste Gondelier and Emmanuel Théaulon
1826: Le Pari, vaudeville in 1 act, with Adolphe Jadin
1827: Le Courrier des théâtres, ou la Revue à franc-étrier, folie-vaudevile in 5 relais, with Jean-Baptiste Gondelier and Emmanuel Théaulon
1827: La Girafe ou Une journée au jardin du Roi, Tableau-à-propos in vaudevilles, with Gondelier and Théaulon
1827: L'Orpheline et l'héritière, comédie en vaudevilles in 2 acts, with Henri de Tully
1828: Le Barbier châtelain, ou la Loterie de Francfort, comédie en vaudevilles in 3 acts, with Emmanuel Théaulon
1828: La Fille de la veuve, comédie en vaudevilles in 2 acts, with Michel-Nicolas Balisson de Rougemont
1828: Lidda, ou la Servante, comédie en vaudevilles in 1 act, with Théaulon
1829: Le Bandit, plau in 2 act, mixed with songs, with Théaulon
1829: Jovial en prison, comédie en vaudevilles in 2 acts, with Gabriel de Lurieu and Théaulon
1829: Le Vieux marin, ou Une campagne imaginaire, vaudeville in 2 acts, with Jadin and Théaulon
1830: Journal de St-Cloud à Cherbourg, ou Récit de ce qui s'est passé à la suite du roi Charles X, du 26 juillet au 16 août 1830
1831: Mémoires, souvenirs et anecdotes sur l'intérieur du palais de Charles X et les événements de 1815 à 1830
1831: Le Noble et l'artisan, ou le Parent de tout le monde, comédie en vaudevilles in 2 acts, with René Perin
1831: Sophie et Mirabeau, ou 1773 et 1789, comédie en vaudevilles in 2 acts, with René Perin and Théaulon
1832: La prisonnière de Blaye
1832: La Baronne et le prince Catastrophe
1832: Edith Mac-Donald, histoire jacobite de 1715
1842: Le Guérillero, opera in 2 acts, with Ambroise Thomas
1844: Marie Stuart, opera in 5 acts, music by Louis Niedermeyer
1844: Analyse de Marie Stuart, opera in 5 acts
1851: M. le Comte de Chambord à Wiesbaden, souvenirs d'août 1850
1851: Quelques Pages du passé pour servir d'enseignement au présent et d'avertissement à l'avenir
1852: La chambre rouge, drama in 5 acts, with Auguste Maquet
1854: L'enfant du régiment, drama in 5 acts, with Auguste Maquet
1855–1856 Histoire de l'ordre militaire de Saint-Louis, depuis son institution en 1693 jusqu'en 1830, with Alexandre Mazas
1856: L'Espion du grand monde, drama in 5 acts, from the novel by Henri de Saint-Georges
1856: La Folle de Savenay
1856: La Reine de Paris, épisode du temps de la Fronde
1857: L'Homme au masque d'acier
1858: Le Chef des Invisibles
1859: Les Deux Marquis
1859: Le Cordonnier de la rue de la Lune
1860: Ivan IV (scènes choisies par l'Académie des beaux-arts pour servir de texte au concours de composition musicale de 1860), music by Émile Paladilhe
1862: Alain de Tinteniac
1863: Le Général Oudinot, duc de Reggio

Bibliography 
 Pierre Larousse, Grand dictionnaire universel du XIXe siècle, T.1, 1866,  
 Louis Gustave Vapereau, Dictionnaire universel des contemporains, 1869,  
 Silvio D'Amico, Enciclopedia dello spettacolo, vol.1, 1975, 
 Guillaume de Bertier de Sauvigny, Alfred Fierro, Bibliographie critique des mémoires sur la Restauration, 1988, 
 Spire Pitou, The Paris Opéra: an encyclopedia of operas, 1990, 
 Olivier de Lagarde, Les noms de famille en Normandie, 1998, 

19th-century French dramatists and playwrights
French opera librettists
19th-century French novelists
Writers from Rouen
1797 births
1869 deaths